The 2017 Brantford Galaxy season was the sixth season in the club's participation in the Canadian Soccer League. They began the season on May 29, 2017, away against Royal Toronto FC. The season concluded with Brantford securing a postseason berth by finishing fifth in the standings. In the preliminary round of the playoffs they were defeated by Scarborough SC.

Summary 
Before the commencement of the 2017 season a change in the managerial structure occurred with Saša Vuković being named the head coach. Throughout the regular season Brantford struggled to achieve significant results, but still was awarded a playoff berth after finishing fifth in the standings. Their reserve team fared slightly better results as they finished fourth in the standings. In the opening round of the postseason the senior squad was eliminated by Scarborough SC, while their reserve team advanced to the next round after defeating the Serbian White Eagles B. The following round they were eliminated from the playoff competition after a 7–0 defeat to FC Ukraine United.

Competitions

Canadian Soccer League

League table

Results summary

Results by round

Matches

League table

Results summary

Results by round

Statistics

Goals and assists 
Correct as of November 30, 2017

References 

Brantford Galaxy
Brantford Galaxy